Glasnost is the second full-length album by Nottingham alternative metal band illuminatus. The album was released through Headroom Records on February 7, 2011.  All songs were written by illuminatus, with all lyrics by Julio Taylor.

Track listing

Personnel
illuminatus
Julio Taylor - Vocals / Guitar
Jon Martin - Guitar
Felix Rullhusen - Drums
Leo Giovazzini - Bass

2011 albums
Illuminatus (band) albums